Australian Community Media (ACM) is a media company in Australia responsible for over 160 regional publications. Its mastheads include the Canberra Times, Newcastle Herald, The Examiner, The Border Mail, The Courier and the Illawarra Mercury along with more than one hundred community-based websites across Australia and numerous agricultural publications including The Land and Queensland Country Life.

The entity was formerly owned by Fairfax Media prior to its merger with Nine Entertainment in 2018. In April 2019, Nine sold the business to former chief executive of real estate platform Domain Antony Catalano and billionaire Alex Waislitz.

History
ACM's origins can be traced back to The Land, founded in Sydney in 1911. In subsequent decades, The Land acquired various other community newspapers. In September 1970, John Fairfax acquired a 25% shareholding. In 1981, the company was renamed Rural Press. In 1985, John Fairfax increased its shareholding from 25% to 45%. In March 1989, Rural Press was listed on the Australian Securities Exchange with Fairfax Holdings having a 51% shareholding.

By the mid-2000s, Rural Press owned approximately 170 newspaper and magazine titles, the Canberra Times being the most prominent. These were predominantly in rural Australia, though it also owned a number of agricultural publications in the United States and New Zealand. It also owned radio stations in regional Queensland, South Australia and Western Australia, a range of Australian classified advertising websites, and Australian commercial printing plants.

On 6 December 2006, it was announced that Rural Press and John Fairfax would merge to form a new company estimated in value at $12 billion. Under the deal, the family company of Rural Press chairman JohnB. Fairfax (who did not have an interest in the company bearing his family's name) took a 13.5 per cent stake in the merged entity. This was just short of a controlling interest, but gave Fairfax a potential blocking stake if Publishing & Broadcasting Limited, News Corporation, the Seven Network or a private equity raider embarked on a hostile takeover, as had been widely anticipated following the Federal Parliament's passage of new media laws on October 18, 2006.

The merger with Fairfax was completed on 8 May 2007. Papers from Rural Press were published under the Fairfax Regional Media brand, which later became Australian Community Media. Fairfax Media merged with Nine Entertainment in December 2018 and Nine sold ACM to Antony Catalano and Alex Waislitz in April 2019.

Newspapers

Regional Daily

New South Wales

External links 
 ACM Ad Centre

References 

Australian news websites
Companies based in Sydney
Companies formerly listed on the Australian Securities Exchange
Fairfax Media
Holding companies of Australia
Mass media in Sydney
Newspaper companies of Australia
Nine Entertainment
2019 mergers and acquisitions